Crenicichla punctata is a species of cichlid native to Uruguay and Brazil.

References

Further reading
 Eschmeyer, William N., ed. 1998 . Catalog of Fishes. Special Publication of the Center for Biodiversity Research and Information, no. 1, vol. 1–3. California Academy of Sciences. San Francisco, California, United States . 2905. 

punctata
Fish of South America
Fish described in 1870